Harmostes is a genus of scentless plant bugs in the family Rhopalidae. There are about seven described species in Harmostes.

Species
 Harmostes angustatus Van Duzee, 1918
 Harmostes dorsalis Burmeister, 1835
 Harmostes formosus Distant, 1881
 Harmostes fraterculus (Say, 1832)
 Harmostes obliquus (Say, 1832)
 Harmostes reflexulus (Say, 1832)
 Harmostes serratus (Fabricius, 1775)

References

Further reading

 
 
 

Rhopalinae
Pentatomomorpha genera